Coorada is a rural locality in the Shire of Banana, Queensland, Australia.

Road infrastructure
The Taroom Bauhinia Downs Road (State Route 7) runs through from south to north.

References 

Shire of Banana
Localities in Queensland